Ary Kara (26 March 1942 – 1 November 2019) was a Brazilian politician and sports executive. He served as a federal deputy from 1999 to 2003 and 2005 to 2007, a state deputy in São Paulo, and a councilor in Taubaté. He also was chairman of Esporte Clube Taubaté from 2009 to 2012.

He was a graduate of the Universidade de Taubaté. On 1 November 2019, Kara died of cancer in São Paulo.

References

1942 births
2019 deaths
Members of the Legislative Assembly of São Paulo
Members of the Chamber of Deputies (Brazil) from São Paulo
Esporte Clube Taubaté
People from Taubaté
20th-century Brazilian politicians
21st-century Brazilian politicians
Deaths from cancer in São Paulo (state)